The 2008–09 season was the 129th season of competitive football by Rangers.

Overview
Rangers played a total of 49 competitive matches during the 2008–09 season. The season began disastrously as the club exited the UEFA Champions League and European football altogether, losing 2–1 on aggregate to Lithuanian side FBK Kaunas in the second qualifying round. The first leg at Ibrox finished goalless, but the return leg ended in defeat for Rangers after an 87th-minute header from Linas Pilibaitis. The financial consequences of the failures to qualify for the Champions League were revealed when the club posted a loss of £3.9m for the six months to December 2008, and in March decided to offer staff the option of voluntary redundancy as a way of cutting costs. There was also mounting pressure on the manager to reduce the first team squad from 28 players to a more manageable figure. The player excess was eased slightly with the departures of Chris Burke, Jean-Claude Darcheville and a couple out on loan deals but the increased debt meant that the club needed to find a cash injection. This resulted in the attempted sale of Kris Boyd to Birmingham City which fell through due to the players wage demands.

In the first Old Firm game of the season, Rangers won 4–2, with Pedro Mendes scoring his first goal for the club, and Kenny Miller scoring a double against his former employers. But the team's league form stuttered thereafter. Despite a run of five wins from six matches following the Old Firm victory, the side trailed Celtic by seven points in the league at the turn of the year. For the first few months of 2009 both sides dropped and gained points on the other and Rangers briefly took over top spot of the Scottish Premier League on 21 February after a win against Kilmarnock. The spell as league leaders lasted less than a fortnight. A defeat and a draw, both at home, to Inverness and Hearts respectively, saw Smith's side sit second in the table, one point behind Celtic, at the split. The fourth Old Firm league meeting of the season finished with a 1–0 win to Rangers, thanks to a Steven Davis strike. This meant that, with three league games remaining, Rangers were two points ahead of Celtic. Further twists and turns followed, both Old Firm sides drew their matches against Hibernian at Easter Road, and so Rangers were ahead by two points with one round of matches remaining. Smith's side just needed a win against Dundee United to guarantee the club's 52nd league title. That is exactly what they got, goals from Kyle Lafferty, Pedro Mendes and Kris Boyd sealed a 3–0 win and the club's first league championship in four seasons.

The club played in the finals of both of the domestic cup competitions for the second season running. The 2009 Scottish League Cup Final was reached by defeating Partick Thistle, Hamilton and Falkirk en route but the final ended in a 2–0 defeat at the hands of Old Firm rivals Celtic. The match was Walter Smith's first ever Old Firm final and was marred by a Kirk Broadfoot sending off deep into extra time for a foul on Aidan McGeady inside the penalty box. Celtic were subsequently awarded a penalty which McGeady himself converted.

Rangers qualified for the 2009 Scottish Cup Final after beating St Mirren 3–0 in the semi-final. The second goal of the game was scored by Kris Boyd and was his 100th goal for Rangers. The team faced Falkirk at Hampden Park on 30 May 2009 in what was the club's 51st Scottish Cup Final appearance. A Nacho Novo strike in the first minute of the second half gave Rangers a 1–0 win and completed the domestic double.

Players

Squad information

Transfers

In

Total spending: £17.8m

Out

Total income: £12.3m

Squad statistics

List of squad players, including number of appearances by competition

|}

Top Scorer

Last updated: 24 May 2009
Source: Match reports
Only competitive matches

Disciplinary record

Last updated: 24 May 2009
Source: Match reports
Only competitive matches

Club

Board of directors

Coaching staff

Other staff

Matches

Scottish Premier League

UEFA Champions League

Scottish Cup

League Cup

Friendlies

Competitions

Overall

Scottish Premier League

Standings

Results summary

Results by round

References 

Rangers F.C. seasons
Rangers
Scottish football championship-winning seasons